

Events 
 January–March 
 January 5 – The Brandenburger—African Company, of the German state of Brandenburg, signs a treaty with representatives of the Ahanta tribe (in what is now Ghana), to establish the fort and settlement of Groß Friedrichsburg, in honor of Frederick William, Elector of Brandenburg.  The location is later renamed Princes Town, also called Pokesu.
 January 6 – The tragic opera Phaëton, written by Jean-Baptiste Lully and Philippe Quinault, is premiered at the Palace of Versailles.
 January 27 – Gove's Rebellion breaks out in the Province of New Hampshire in North America as a revolt against the Royal Governor, Edward Cranfield.  Most of the participants, and their leader Edward Gove, are arrested.  Gowe is convicted of treason but pardoned three years later.
 February 7 – The opera Giustino by Giovanni Legrenzi and about the life of the Byzantine Emperor Justin, premieres in Venice. 
 March 14 – Ageng Tirtayasa, Sultan of Banten on the island of Java (now part of Indonesia), is captured by the soldiers hired by the Dutch East India Company.
 March 17 – In a battle at Kalyan (near Bombay) between the Maratha Empire and the Mughal Empire in India, Maratha General Hambirrao Mohite defeats the local Mughal official, Ranamast Khan.
 March 31 – Authorized representatives of King John III Sobieski of Poland and Emperor Leopold I of the Holy Roman Empire sign a military alliance treaty in Warsaw.

 April–June 
 April 10 – Charles V, Duke of Lorraine is appointed commander of the Imperial Army of the Holy Roman Empire.
 May 3 – Sultan Mehmed IV of the Ottoman Empire enters Belgrade.
 May 24 – The Ashmolean Museum opens in Oxford (England), as the world's first university museum.
 June 12 – The Rye House Plot to assassinate Charles II of England is discovered.

 July–September 
 July 8 – Admiral Shi Lang of Qing dynasty China leads 300 ships with 20,000 troops out of Tongshan, Fujian, and sails towards the Kingdom of Tungning, in modern-day Taiwan and Penghu, in order to quell the kingdom in the name of the Qing. 
 July 14 – A 173,000-man Ottoman force arrives at Vienna, and starts to besiege the city. 
 July 16–17 – Battle of Penghu: Qing Chinese admiral Shi Lang defeats the naval forces of Zheng Keshuang decisively.
 July 21 – The gruesome execution of Lord Russell, for his role in the 1683 Rye House Plot to assassinate King Charles II of England, is carried out by the royal executioner Jack Ketch, who wields his axe in a manner requiring multiple blows to make Russell suffer as much as possible during the beheading.  
 August 4 – Turhan, in the powerful role of the Valide sultan of the Ottoman Empire since 1648 as the mother of Sultan Mehmed IV, dies at the age of 56, bringing an end to the era in Ottoman history known as the "Sultanate of Women".  Upon the overthrow of Mehmed IV four years later, the role of the mother of the Ottoman Sultan is less powerful.
 August 18 – Francesco Maria Imperiale Lercari becomes the new Doge of the Republic of Genoa.
 August 20 – Bahadur, son of the Emperor Aurangzeb of the Mughal Empire in India, is dispatched along with other Mughal nobles on an invasion of Konkan, the area on the southwestern Indian coast under the control of the Maratha Empire.
 August 25 – The Earl of Limerick, Irishman Thomas Dongan, takes office as the new British Colonial Governor of the Province of New York and makes major reforms to restore public order and rescue the province from bankruptcy.
 September 5 – Qing Chinese admiral Shi Lang receives the formal surrender of Zheng Keshuang, ushering in the collapse of the Kingdom of Tungning, which is then incorporated into the Qing Empire. 
 September 12  
Battle of Vienna: The Ottoman siege of the city is broken with the arrival of a force of 70,000 Poles, Austrians and Germans under Polish–Lithuanian king Jan III Sobieski, whose cavalry turns their flank.  The victory marks a turning point in the Ottoman Empire's fortunes and the end of the Turkish attempt to expand its control into Western Europe. 
Pedro II becomes the King of Portugal after having served as regent since 1668 for his older brother Afonso VI.

 October–December 
 October 3 – Shi Lang reaches Taiwan and occupies modern-day Kaohsiung.
 October 6 – Germantown, Philadelphia is founded as the first permanent German settlement in North America (in 1983 U.S. President Ronald Reagan declares a 300th Year Celebration, and in 1987, it becomes an annual holiday, German-American Day).
 October 9 (possible date) – Louis XIV of France makes a morganatic marriage with Madame de Maintenon in a secret ceremony following the death on July 30 of his queen consort, Maria Theresa of Spain.
 November 1 – The English crown colony of the Province of New York is subdivided into 12 counties: Albany, Dutchess, Orange, Ulster, and Westchester (upstate); Kings, New York County, Queens, Richmond (within New York City); Suffolk (eastern Long Island), and two areas not in New York state, Dukes County (now in Massachusetts) and Cornwall County (now 11 counties in Maine). 
 December 7 – Algernon Sidney, opponent of King Charles II of England and author of the rebel tract Discourses Concerning Government is beheaded after having been arrested on June 25 and found guilty on November 7.
 December 25 – 
Kara Mustafa Pasha, Grand Vizier of the Ottoman Empire since 1676, is executed on orders of Sultan Mehmed IV after being blamed for the Ottoman loss of the Battle of Vienna on September 12.  The execution is carried out in Belgrade as Kara Mustafa is strangled with a silk cord.  The Sultan appoints Bayburtlu Kara Ibrahim Pasha as the new Grand Vizier.
George Ducas, the Prince of Moldavia installed by the Ottomans in 1678, is arrested by Polish authorities while on his way back to Bucharest from the defeat by Poland in the Battle of Vienna.  Ducas is replaced by Ștefan Petriceicu. 
 December 27 – Richard Keigwin leads a rebellion against the East India Company to take over as Governor of Bombay and most of the British territory in India, driving out Governor Sir John Child and arresting the Deputy Governor, Charles Ward.  Keigwin surrenders the office less than a year later.
 December – The River Thames in England freezes, allowing a frost fair to be held.

 Date unknown 
 Wild boars are hunted to extinction in Britain.

Births 

 January 13 – Christoph Graupner, German composer (d. 1760)
 January 29 – Juan de Galavís, Spanish Catholic Archbishop of Santo Domingo, Bogotá (d. 1739)
 February 4 – Jean-Baptiste Bénard de la Harpe, French explorer of North America (d. 1765)
 February 28 – René Antoine Ferchault de Réaumur, French scientist (d. 1757)
 March 1 – Caroline of Ansbach, British queen and regent, wife of George II of Great Britain (d. 1737)
 April 3 – Mark Catesby, English naturalist (d. 1749)
 June 23 – Étienne Fourmont, French orientalist (d. 1745)
 September 7 – Maria Anna of Austria, Archduchess of Austria and Queen consort of Portugal (d. 1754)
 September 11 – Farrukhsiyar, Mughal Emperor (d. 1719)
 September 25 – Jean-Philippe Rameau, French composer (d. 1764)
 October 17 – Aixinjueluo Yuntang, born Aixinjueluo Yintang, Qing prince (d. 1726)
 October 25 – Charles FitzRoy, 2nd Duke of Grafton, British politician (d. 1757)
 November 10 – King George II of Great Britain (d. 1760)
 November 30 – Ludwig Andreas von Khevenhüller, Austrian field marshal (d. 1744)
 December 19 – King Philip V of Spain (d. 1746)
 December 27 – Conyers Middleton, English minister (d. 1750)
 date unknown
 Anna Maria Thelott, Swedish artist (d. 1710)
 Benedicta Margareta von Löwendal, German industrialist (d. 1776)

Deaths 

 January 2 – Sir Thomas Twisden, 1st Baronet, English politician (b. 1602)
 January 14 – Edward Thurland, English politician (b. 1607)
 January 15 – Philip Warwick, English writer and politician (b. 1609)
 January 21 – Anthony Ashley Cooper, 1st Earl of Shaftesbury, British politician (b. 1621)
 January 28 – Julian Maunoir, French Jesuit priest (b. 1606)
 January 30 – Cesare Facchinetti, Italian Roman Catholic cardinal (b. 1608)
 February 18 – Nicolaes Pieterszoon Berchem, Dutch painter (b. 1620)
 February 27 – Engel de Ruyter, Dutch admiral (b. 1649)
 February 28 – Johann Paul Freiherr von Hocher, Austrian chancellor (b. 1616)
 March 6 – Guarino Guarini, Italian architect of the Piedmontese Baroque (b. 1624)
 March 8 – Robert Paston, 1st Earl of Yarmouth, English politician, earl (b. 1631)
 March 11 – Giovanni Bernardo Carboni, Italian painter (b. 1614)
 March 14 – Robert Montagu, 3rd Earl of Manchester, English politician (b. 1634)
 March 16 – Henrik Bjelke, Norwegian military officer (b. 1615)
 March 19 – Thomas Killigrew, English dramatist (b. 1612)
 April 28 – Daniel Casper von Lohenstein, German writer, diplomat and lawyer (b. 1635)
 March 29 – Yaoya Oshichi, young Japanese girl burned at the stake for arson (b. 1667)
 May 2 – Stjepan Gradić, Croatian philosopher and scientist (b. 1613)
 May 15 – John Ernest II, Duke of Saxe-Weimar (b. 1627)
 June 4 – Wolfgang George Frederick von Pfalz-Neuburg, German bishop (b. 1659)
 July 7 – Elisabeth Henriette of Hesse-Kassel, daughter of William VI (b. 1661)
 July 10 – François Eudes de Mézeray, French historian (b. 1610)
 July 13 – Arthur Capell, 1st Earl of Essex, English statesman (b. 1631)
 July 21 – William Russell, Lord Russell, English politician (b. 1639)
 July 26 – Jean Le Vacher, French Lazarist missionary and French consul (b. 1619)
 July 30 – Maria Theresa of Spain, French queen, married to Louis XIV of France (b. 1638)
 August 4 – Turhan Hatice Sultan, Ottoman Valide Sultan, married to Ibrahim and the mother of Sultan Mehmed IV (b. 1627) 
 August 18 – Charles Hart, English actor (b. 1625)
 August 22 – Sir John Hobart, 3rd Baronet, English landowner and politician (b. 1628)
 August 24 – John Owen, English non-conformist theologian (b. 1616)
 September 6 – Jean-Baptiste Colbert, French minister of finance (b. 1619)
 September 12 – King Afonso VI of Portugal (b. 1643)
 September 17 – John Campanius, Swedish Lutheran minister in New Sweden (b. 1601)
 October 1 – John Hull, colonial American merchant and politician (b. 1624)
 October 8 – Philipp Friedrich Böddecker, German organist and composer (b. 1607)
 October 9 – Francesco Caetani, 8th Duke of Sermoneta, Governor of the Duchy of Milan (b. 1613)
 October 25 – William Scroggs, lord chief justice of England (b. c. 1623)
 November 10 
 John Collins, English mathematician (b. 1625)
 Robert Morison, Scottish botanist and taxonomist (b. 1620)
 November 16 – Margareta Huitfeldt, Norwegian-Swedish noble (b. 1608)
 November 29 – John Wright, British politician (b. 1615)
 December 7
 John Oldham, English poet (smallpox) (b. 1653)
 Algernon Sidney, English politician (b. 1623)
 December 13 – Anna Sophia II, Abbess of Quedlinburg, Abbesses of Quedlinburg (b. 1638)
 December 15 – Izaak Walton, English writer (b. 1593)
 December 16 – John Knight, Member of the Parliament of England (b. 1613)
 December 25 – Samuel Clarke, English writer and priest (b. 1599)
 December 27 – Maria Francisca of Savoy, Queen consort of Portugal (b. 1646)

Date unknown 
 Birgitta Durell, Swedish industrialist  (b. 1616)
 Roger Williams, English theologian and colonist (b. 1603)

References